The 2015 FIS Ski Jumping Grand Prix was the 22nd Summer Grand Prix season in ski jumping on plastic for men and the 4th for ladies.

Other competitive circuits this season included the World Cup, Continental Cup, FIS Cup, FIS Race and Alpen Cup.

Calendar

Men

Ladies

Men's team

Men's standings

Overall

Nations Cup

Prize money

Ladies' standings

Overall

Nations Cup

Prize money

References 

Grand Prix
FIS Grand Prix Ski Jumping